DeSoto County is a county located in the Florida Heartland region of the U.S. state of Florida. As of the 2020 census, the population was 33,976. Its county seat is Arcadia.

DeSoto County comprises the Arcadia, FL Micropolitan Statistical Area, which is included in the North Port-Sarasota, FL Combined Statistical Area.

History
Prior to the arrival of the Spanish, what is now DeSoto County was within the territory of the Calusa Indians.

In 1513, Ponce De Leon sailed into present-day Charlotte Harbor near the mouth of the Peace River to put in for repairs and maintenance on his ships.  While there the Spanish encountered Calusa Indians and soon after an argument broke out and several died on both sides.  Then the Spanish kidnapped several Calusa and departed Charlotte Harbor and sailed S.W. away from the west coast of Florida.  This occurred within the original boundaries of DeSoto County.

In 1521, Ponce De Leon attempted to establish a colony at or near Charlotte Harbor but again was turned away by the Calusa who wounded him.  Shortly after, he died and was buried in Puerto Rico.

In 1528 the Spanish Conquistadors Panfilo De Narvaez and Cabeza De Vaca came to present-day Arcadia where they captured several Calusa Indians who told them of great quantities of gold located to the north and offered to guide them there.

In 1539 the Spanish Explorer Hernando DeSoto, for whom the county is named, anchored in Charlotte Harbor and set about to explore the region with mixed results.  Eventually, he made his way up the coast to present-day Manatee County and went inland from there.

While Florida was claimed by Spain the moment it was discovered, the territory of La Florida was not formalized until 1565 with the founding of St. Augustine. At that point, what is now DeSoto County became part of La Florida. In 1763, the region became part of East Florida under British Rule.  In 1783, East Florida was returned to Spain at which point today's DeSoto county was once again Spanish territory.  In 1821 it became U.S. Territory.

In 1841 Camp Ogden, later Fort Ogden was built as a staging area for the U.S. Army during the 2nd Seminole War, in the southwestern part of present-day DeSoto County.

In 1870, the Joshua Creek Church and neighboring cemetery was founded.

In the 1870s John W. Whidden, a Confederate veteran and former Manatee county clerk, settled along the Joshua Creek where he founded a cattle ranch raising thousands of head of cattle.  Also in the 1870s, Union veteran Robert C. Hendry took up cattle ranching on the Joshua Creek in the now-defunct settlement of Davidson.

In 1876 the Fort Ogden Post Office was founded and remains the oldest post office in the county.

DeSoto County was created in 1887 from Manatee County. It was named for Spanish explorer Hernando de Soto, whose name was also honored in Hernando County.

DeSoto County originally included several other present-day counties until 1921, when the Florida legislature created the following new counties: Charlotte, Glades, Hardee, and Highlands.

During World War II, DeSoto County operated the Carlstrom Field Air Base, which provided training for both American and British pilots. Twenty-three British pilots were killed while training at the base and are honored at DeSoto County's Oak Ridge Cemetery, which is located in the town of Arcadia. In 1945, the base turned out its last cadets and was decommissioned. The base was then sold to the State of Florida for one dollar and later converted into a mental health facility known as G. Pierce Wood Memorial Hospital. The hospital has since been converted into a facility for juvenile offenders. The facility was closed and is now up for sale.

On August 13, 2004, Hurricane Charley passed directly through DeSoto County. Hurricane-force winds persisted for an hour, damaging most of the structures in the county and causing some to be completely destroyed.

Geography
The highest elevation in DeSoto County is 96 feet and is located right on the border between DeSoto County and Highlands County and is about three miles south of the border with Hardee County. The lowest elevation in DeSoto County is sea level and is located in the Peace River near its mouth.

Adjacent counties
 Hardee County, Florida - north
 Highlands County, Florida - east
 Glades County, Florida - southeast
 Charlotte County, Florida - south
 Sarasota County, Florida - west
 Manatee County, Florida - northwest

Lakes 
The largest body of water in DeSoto County not including the Peace River is a man made reservoir located within the RV Griffin Reserve and is not open to the public.
The largest natural lake in DeSoto County is Sour Orange lake and is located at 27°07'23.2"N 81°39'07.0"W
Lake Operation is located at 27°06'56.0"N 81°39'43.0"W
Split Lake is located at 27°10'33.5"N 81°37'18.7"W
Besides the Peace River, and the three above bodies of water, there are few other natural bodies of water of note, mostly small ponds and most are not named.  There are about as many man made retention ponds in DeSoto County.

Rivers 
 Peace River

Demographics

As of the 2020 United States census, there were 33,976 people, 12,421 households, and 8,306 families residing in the county.

As of the census of 2000, there were 32,209 people, 10,746 households, and 7,672 families residing in the county. There were 13,608 housing units at an average density of 21 per square mile (8/km2). The racial makeup of the county was 73.33% White, 12.72% Black or African American, 1.59% Native American, 0.41% Asian, 0.04% Pacific Islander, 10.49% from other races, and 1.43% from two or more races.  24.90% of the population were Hispanic or Latino of any race.

2005 estimates showed the population as being 56.3% non-Hispanic white, 31.4% Latino, 11.8% African-American and 2.9% Native American. (Source=WebCite query result

In 2000 there were 10,746 households, out of which 26.50% had children under the age of 18 living with them, 55.50% were married couples living together, 10.30% had a female householder with no husband present, and 28.60% were non-families. 21.00% of all households were made up of individuals, and 11.40% had someone living alone who was 65 years of age or older.  The average household size was 2.70 and the average family size was 3.00.

In the county, the population was spread out, with 22.70% under the age of 18, 11.20% from 18 to 24, 26.70% from 25 to 44, 20.50% from 45 to 64, and 19.00% who were 65 years of age or older.  The median age was 36 years. For every 100 females, there were 128.30 males.  For every 100 females age 18 and over, there were 134.70 males.

The median income for a household in the county was $30,714, and the median income for a family was $34,726. Males had a median income of $22,572 versus $20,004 for females. The per capita income for the county was $14,000.  About 14.20% of families and 23.60% of the population were below the poverty line, including 31.50% of those under age 18 and 7.30% of those age 65 or over.

Politics

Voter registration
According to the Secretary of State's office, Republicans are a plurality of registered voters in DeSoto County.

Statewide elections

Library
DeSoto County is part of the Heartland Library Cooperative which serves DeSoto County and some of the surrounding counties, including Glades, Highlands, Hardee, and Okeechobee. The seven-branch library system has one branch in Arcadia.

Local media

Newspaper
The Charlotte Sun produces a section dedicated to Desoto County called The Arcadian. Locally, the section is offered as a standalone for residential delivery.

Television
Desoto County is part of the Fort Myers/Naples DMA. Almost all stations from Fort Myers and Naples are receivable within the county, as well as some stations from the Tampa/St. Petersburg/Sarasota DMA. There was formerly a low-power television station, WALM-LD on channel 34; however, the station's license was cancelled by the FCC on September 21, 2020.

Radio
DeSoto County has two radio stations licensed to locations within the county:

 WCXS (1480 AM Classic Country)
 WZSP (105.3 FM La Zeta - Mexican)

Communities

City
 Arcadia

Census-designated place
 Southeast Arcadia

Unincorporated communities
 Brownville
 Fort Ogden
 Hidden Acres
 Hull
 Lake Suzy
 Nocatee

Ghost town
 Liverpool
 Pine Level

Transportation

Airports
Arcadia Municipal Airport is the only public-use airport in DeSoto County.

Major highways

  Interstate 75
  U.S. Route 17
  State Road 31
  State Road 70
  State Road 72

I-75 runs only a short section in the very southwestern tip of the county and has no major junctions within the county.

See also
 Florida Heartland
 National Register of Historic Places listings in DeSoto County, Florida

Notes

References

External links

Government links/Constitutional offices
 DeSoto County Board of County Commissioners official website
 DeSoto County Supervisor of Elections
 DeSoto County Property Appraiser
 DeSoto County Sheriff's Office
 DeSoto County Tax Collector
 DeSoto County Economic Development Office

Special districts
 DeSoto County Public Schools
 Southwest Florida Water Management District
 Heartland Library Cooperative

Judicial branch
  Office of the State Attorney, 12th Judicial Circuit of Florida serving DeSoto, Manatee, and Sarasota counties
  Circuit and County Court for the 12th Judicial Circuit of Florida

Tourism links
 DeSoto County Chamber of Commerce
 DeSoto County Tourism Development Council

Media
  WFLM-AM (1480 WFLN Newsradio)
  WZZS-FM (106.9 The Bull)
  WZSP-FM (105.3 La Zeta)
 DeSoto County News and The Arcadian historical newspapers for DeSoto County are openly accessible in the Florida Digital Newspaper Library

 
Populated places established in 1887
Florida counties
Micropolitan areas of Florida
1887 establishments in Florida